is a Japanese former rugby union player. He played as centre.

Career
Nanba first played in 1992 for the Sagamidai Technical High School, where he was a driving force for his team's second National High School Rugby Tournament consecutive victory in 1994. In 1995, he graduated from high school and played for the Teikyo University rugby union club. In 1999, Nanba graduated from university and joined Toyota Verblitz, where he would play until his retirement in 2011. At international level, Nanba first represented Japan during the test match against Fiji in Tokyo, on 20 May 2000. He was also called up for the Japan squad for the 2003 Rugby World Cup, where he played his last international test cap, during the match against France, in Townsville, on 18 October 2003.

References

External links
2019 ALL FOR JAPAN TEAM
ジャパンラグビートップリーグ 選手情報
Hideki Nanba international stats at ESPN Scrum

1976 births
Teikyo University alumni
Japanese rugby union players
Sportspeople from Kanagawa Prefecture
Toyota Verblitz players
Japan international rugby union players
Rugby union centres
Living people
Rugby union players at the 1998 Asian Games
Asian Games silver medalists for Japan
Medalists at the 1998 Asian Games